The 2014 Hassanal Bolkiah Trophy was the fifth edition of the invitational tournament hosted by Brunei. The tournament take place in Brunei from 9–23 August 2014. Eleven teams from the Asean Football Federation participate in the tournament for under the age of 22. The draw took place on 12 July 2014 at the National Football Association of Brunei Darussalam (NFABD) House. The teams are divided into two groups. Host country, Brunei, were given a chance to choose which group they wished to be drawn in. Brunei chose to be drawn in group B. Indonesia was to confirm its participation in the tournament but was not included in the initial draw. Indonesia's participation was later confirmed by the National Football Association of Brunei Darussalam on 20 July and a second draw was held on 22 July to include Indonesia. Indonesia send its U19 team.

Myanmar emerged as the champion after beating Vietnam by 4–3 in the final, while both Malaysia and Thailand shared the third place.

Venues

Match officials 
Seven referees and eight assistants were selected for the tournament:

Match Commissioner & Referee Assessor

Squads

Group stage 
 All times are Brunei Darussalam Time (BNT) – UTC+8.

Tie-breaking criteria 
The teams are ranked according to points (3 points for a win, 1 point for a tie, 0 points for a loss) and tie breakers are in following order:
 Greater number of points obtained in the group matches between the teams concerned;
 Goal difference resulting from the group matches between the teams concerned;
 Greater number of goals scored in the group matches between the teams concerned;
 Result of direct matches;
 Drawing of lots.

Group A

Group B

Knockout stage

Semi-finals

Final

Goalscorers 
6 goals
  Adi Said

5 goals

  Dimas Drajad
  Hồ Tuấn Tài

4 goals

  Aung Thu
  Maung Maung Soe
  Myo Ko Tun
  Chenrop Samphaodi

3 goals
  Nguyễn Công Phượng

2 goals

  Abdul Azim Abdul Rashid
  Chan Vathanaka
  Ilham Udin Armaiyn
  Ketsada Souksavanh
  Mohd Ramzi Sufian
  Nyein Chan Aung
  Than Paing
  Kenshiro Daniels
  Janepob Phokhi
  Montree Promsawat
  Nguyễn Phong Hồng Duy
  Phan Văn Long

1 goal

  Mohd Najib Tarif
  Reduan Petara
  Kouch Sokumpheak
  Nub Tola
  Prak Mony Udom
  Sok Sovan
  Paulo Oktavianus Sitanggang
  Septian David Maulana
  Maitee
  Phoutthasay Khochalern
  Tiny Bounmalay
  Xaisongkham Champathong
  Mohd Asri Mardzuki
  Mohd Syawal Nordin
  Muhd Nor Azam Azih
  Nurshamil Abdul Ghani
  Shahrul Igwan Samsudin
  Nanda Kyaw
  Swan Htet Aung
  Yan Naing Oo
  Jaime Cheng
  Jason de Jong
  Kennedy Uzoka
  OJ Porteria
  Muhd Zakir Samsudin
  Yuz Henzry Mohd Jamil
  Boonkerd Chaiyasin
  Chaowat Veerachat
  Nopphon Ponkam
  Prasid Jantum
  Henrique Wilsons Da Cruz Martins
  Marcos Morais Guasmao
  Nataniel de Jesus Reis
  Hoàng Thanh Tùng
  Lê Văn Sơn
  Lương Xuân Trường
  Nguyễn Văn Toàn

Team statistics 
As per statistical convention in football, matches decided in extra time are counted as wins and losses, while matches decided by penalty shoot-outs are counted as draws.

References

External links 
 2014 Results

 
2014 in Asian football

2014
2014 in Brunei football
2014 in Burmese football
2014 in Malaysian football
2014 in Philippine football
2014 in Laotian football
2014 in Vietnamese football
2014 in Singaporean football
2014 in Thai football
2014 in Indonesian football
2014 in East Timorese sport
2014 in Cambodian football
August 2014 sports events in Asia